This is a list of the first women lawyer(s) and judge(s) in Indiana. It includes the year in which the women were admitted to practice law (in parentheses). Also included are women who achieved other distinctions such becoming the first in their state to graduate from law school or become a political figure.

Firsts in Indiana's history

Lawyers 

First female: Elizabeth Eaglesfield (1875) 
First female to practice law after appealing to the Indiana Supreme Court: Antoinette Dakin Leach (1893) 
First African American female: Helen Elsie Austin (1930)
First Asian American female (Filipino descent): Lourdes Dellota Alba (1966)

State judges 

 First female: Ella Groninger in 1919 
 First female (elected): V. Sue Shields in 1964 
 First female (county court): Linda Lucille Chezem in 1975  
 First African American female: Phyllis Senegal (1975)  
 First female (Indiana Court of Appeals): V. Sue Shields in 1978 
 First female (circuit court): Linda Lucille Chezem in 1982  
 First (African American) female (Indiana Supreme Court): Myra C. Selby (1995) 
 First female (Chief Justice; Indiana Supreme Court): Loretta Rush in 2014

Federal judges 
First female (U.S. District Court for the Southern District of Indiana): Sarah Evans Barker (1969) 
First African American (female) (U.S. District Court for the Southern District of Indiana): Tanya Walton Pratt (2010) 
First African American (female) from Indiana (United States Court of Appeals for the Seventh Circuit): Doris Pryor (2022)

Attorney General of Indiana 

 First (African American) female: Pamela Carter from 1993-1997

Public Defender 

 First (African American) female: Harriette Bailey Conn in 1970

United States Attorney 

 First female (U.S. Attorney for the Southern District of Indiana; full term): Virginia Dill McCarty (1977) from 1977-1981 
 First female (Northern District of Indiana; Acting): Tina L. Nommay in 2021

Assistant United States Attorney 

 First female: Sarah Evans Barker (1969) in 1972

Bar Association 

 First female president (Indiana State Bar Association): Jeanne S. Miller in 1988 
 First female president (Indianapolis Bar Association): Mary Y. Marsh in 1988  
 First African American female president (Indianapolis Bar Association): Cynthia J. Ayers in 2006

Firsts in local history

 Carina Warrington (1915): First female lawyer in Allen County, Indiana
 Karen E. Richards: First female to serve as the Prosecutor for Allen County, Indiana
 Lisa Swaim: First female judge in Cass County, Indiana (2019)
 Clementine Barthold (1980): First female judge in Clark County, Indiana
 Judith Dwyer (1963): First female judge in Daviess County, Indiana (1987)
 Derexa Savage King (1951): First female lawyer in Dubois County, Indiana
 Beth Ann Butsch: First female lawyer and judge (2010) in Fayette County, Indiana
 Susan Orth: First female judge in Floyd County, Indiana (2004)
 Edith Eulalia Hendren (1921): First female lawyer in Greene County, Indiana
 Dena Benham Martin: First female judge in Greene County, Indiana
 AmyMarie Travis: First female appointed as a Judge of the Superior Court of Jackson County (2018)
 Cynthia S. Emkes (1985): First female judge in Johnson County, Indiana (1987)
 Susan Hemminger: First female judge in LaPorte County, Indiana
 Kimberly Kiner: First African American female judge in LaPorte County, Indiana
 Linda Lucille Chezem: First female to serve as a Judge of the Lawrence County Court, Indiana (1975)
 Hentietta Trisch Willkie (1897): First woman admitted to the bar in Madison County.
 Angela Warner Sims: First female circuit judge for Madison County, Indiana (2012)
 Ella Groninger: First female judge in Marion County, Indiana (1919)
 Z. Mae Jimison: First African American female appointed as a Judge of the Superior Court in Marion County, Indiana (1988)
 Cynthia J. Ayers: First African American female elected as a Judge of the Superior Court in Marion County, Indiana (1991)
 Karen E. Bravo: First African American (female) to serve as the Dean of Indiana University Robert H. McKinney School of Law (2020)

 Helen Hironimus: First female lawyer in Mount Vernon, Posey County, Indiana
 Frances Tilton Weaver (1925): First female lawyer in Porter County, Indiana
 Shelli Wright Johnson (1979): First female lawyer in Portage, Indiana [Porter County, Indiana]
 Mary Harper: First female to serve as the Deputy Prosecutor and Chief Deputy Prosecutor (1975-1981), a Superior Court Judge (1984), and a Judge of the Circuit Court (1996) in Porter County, Indiana
 Lisa M. Traylor-Wolff (1986): First female lawyer in Pulaski County, Indiana
 Maxine E. Ryer Miller (1922): First female lawyer in St. Joseph County, Indiana
 Elizabeth Fletcher Allen (1938): First African American female lawyer in St. Joseph County, Indiana
 Stephanie Steele: First African American female to serve as President of the St. Joseph County Bar Association (2019)
 Graciela Olivarez: First (Latino American) female to graduate from Notre Dame Law School (1970) [St. Joseph County, Indiana]
 Helen M. Gougar (1895): First female lawyer in Tippecanoe County, Indiana
 Tamar Althouse Scholz (1893): First woman to practice law in Evansville, Vanderburgh County, Indiana. She was also the first woman to graduate (1892) from the Indiana University's Department of Law.
 Sue Ann Hartig: First female judicial officer in Vanderburgh County, Indiana
 Mary Margaret “Maggie” Lloyd: First elected female judge in Vanderburgh County, Indiana (2000)
 Elizabeth "Bessie" Jane Eaglesfield (1875): First woman in Indiana admitted to the bar, Vigo County Circuit Court, September 8. 1875.
 Barbara Brugnaux: First female judge in Vigo County, Indiana
 Amy Catherine Cornell: First female appointed as a Judge of the Wabash County Superior Court, Indiana (2017)

See also  

 List of first women lawyers and judges in the United States
 Timeline of women lawyers in the United States
 Women in law

Other topics of interest

 List of first minority male lawyers and judges in the United States
 List of first minority male lawyers and judges in Indiana

References

American women lawyers
Lists of women by occupation and nationality
Indiana law
Women in Indiana
Lists of American legal professionals
Lists of people from Indiana